Coalfields Road, is a Western Australian highway linking Roelands (near Bunbury) on the South Western Highway with Arthur River on the Albany Highway.

Route description
Coalfields Road is the main road to the key mining town of Collie, and passes through mining, forest and agricultural areas with stands of jarrah, wandoo and flood gum nearby. It also traverses the towns of Allanson and Darkan. The section between Collie and Allanson was upgraded in 2010–2011 by increasing the lane and shoulder widths, realigning some of the worst of the winding road sections, lessening some curves, and other improvements.

Route 107 continues beyond Arthur River to Wagin, Dumbleyung, Lake Grace, Newdegate and Lake King, meeting up with South Coast Highway (Route 1) a few kilometres from Ravensthorpe.

Major intersections

See also

Highways in Australia
List of highways in Western Australia

Notes

Highways in rural Western Australia